Chiron World Sports Cars is a British company, based in Worcester, which designs and constructs racing cars. The company was founded in 2002 by Henry Nickless. To date Chiron have only built sports-prototype cars, but have worked on smaller engine capacity divisions up to 2000cc, many of which are called Supersports. The LMP3 design has won titles in Europe and Australia, utilising Vauxhall, Toyota and later Honda engines.

References

Car manufacturers of the United Kingdom
British racecar constructors
British companies established in 2002